Al-Karak is a Syrian village in Daraa District in Daraa Governorate. According to the Syria Central Bureau of Statistics (CBS), Al-Karak had a population of 10,510 in the 2004 census.

History
In 1596, Al-Karak appeared in the Ottoman tax registers  as Karak al-Bataniyya'''; part of the nahiya of Bani Malik al-Asraf'' in the Hauran Sanjak. It had an entirely Muslim population consisting of 45 households and 71 bachelors. The villagers paid a fixed tax rate of 40% on various agricultural products, including   wheat (10800 akçe), barley (1800), summer crops (4200), goats and beehives (1700), in addition to "occasional revenues"(1500);  a total of 20,000  akçe. 5/24 of the revenue went to a waqf.

In 1838, it  was noted as "Greek" Christian village, situated "In the Nukrah, South of Eshmiskin".

References

Bibliography

External links
El Karak-map; 21m

Populated places in Daraa District
Villages in Syria